Bernd Dörfel (born 18 December 1944) is a German former professional footballer who played as a forward.

Club career 
Dörfel was born in Hamburg. He spent seven seasons in the Bundesliga with Hamburger SV and Eintracht Braunschweig.

International career 
Dörfel represented West Germany 15 times, including UEFA Euro 1968 qualifier against Albania, 1970 FIFA World Cup qualifiers against Austria (twice), Scotland and Cyprus and ten friendlies. He was not selected to the 1970 FIFA World Cup final squad because of his poor form in the 1969–70 season.

Honours
 UEFA Cup Winners' Cup finalist: 1967–68
 DFB-Pokal finalist: 1966–67

Trivia 
His brother Gert Dörfel also played football professionally.

References

External links
 
 
 

1944 births
Living people
German footballers
Footballers from Hamburg
Association football forwards
Germany under-21 international footballers
Germany international footballers
Bundesliga players
Swiss Super League players
Hamburger SV II players
Hamburger SV players
Eintracht Braunschweig players
Servette FC players
West German expatriate footballers
West German expatriate sportspeople in Switzerland
Expatriate footballers in Switzerland
20th-century German people
West German footballers